Simmons–Sebrell–Camp House, also known as the Zebulon Simmons Tract, is a historic home and farm located near Courtland, Southampton County, Virginia. It was built about 1770, and expanded and modified in 1858.  It is a two-story, five-bay, Italianate style frame farmhouse.  It features an elaborate two-story porch and rear ell, also with a two-story porch. Also on the property are the contributing former cold storage building or cellar, and three larger-scale agricultural support buildings.

It was listed on the National Register of Historic Places in 2003.

References

Houses on the National Register of Historic Places in Virginia
Italianate architecture in Virginia
Houses completed in 1858
Houses in Southampton County, Virginia
National Register of Historic Places in Southampton County, Virginia